The 2008–09 Savannah State Lady Tigers basketball team competed in American basketball on behalf of Savannah State University. The Lady Tigers were members of the NCAA Division I-AA, as an independent. The head coach is Cedric Hardy, who served his fifth year. The team played its home games at Tiger Arena in Savannah, Georgia.

The Lady Tigers entered the season seeking to improve on the 14–15 record posted in the 2007–08 season, but finished with an 8–20 regular season record. The Lady Tigers were 1–2 in the Division I Women's  Independent Tournament.

Preseason notes
 – Ashlee Barley, Kymberli Stamps, Raven Fields, Shikerrie Turpin, and Alicia Nelson sign letters-of-intent with Savannah State University.
 – Darice Fountaine signed a letter-of-intent with Savannah State University.

Roster

Coaching staff

Schedule

Awards
Senior guard Lashara Smith and freshman point guard Crissa Jackson received an honorable mention on the 2008–09 Division I All Independent women's basketball team.
LaShara Smith was selected as the Most Valuable Player for the 2008–09 season.

See also
 2008–09 Savannah State Tigers basketball team

References

Savannah State Tigers
Savannah State Lady Tigers basketball seasons